Gregory J. Brannon (born August 17, 1960) is an American physician and political activist. A native of Los Angeles, California, Brannon is a graduate of the University of Southern California and Chicago Medical School. After completing his residency, Brannon established a private obstetrics practice in Cary, North Carolina.

An ally of the Tea Party movement, Brannon unsuccessfully sought the Republican nomination for U.S. Senate in the 2014 and the 2016 elections. He came in second place both times, losing the 2014 race to Thom Tillis and the 2016 race to Richard Burr.

Early life and education
Brannon was born in Inglewood, California, on August 17, 1960. Brannon was raised by a single mother in the suburbs of Los Angeles.

Brannon received his bachelor's degree from the University of Southern California in 1982, his medical degree from Chicago Medical School in 1988, and completed his residency at University of Southern California Women's Hospital, Los Angeles, in 1992.

Medical and business career
After completing his residency, Brannon served as assistant professor of obstetrics and gynecology at University of North Carolina School of Medicine, with work at Wake Area Health Education Center. He is an ob-gyn in Cary, North Carolina, having entered private practice in 1993.

In February 2014, a jury determined, in a civil case, that Brannon made false and misleading statements to potential investors of a technology company, which later went out of business. Brannon, who was a board member of the company, Neogence Enterprises, and was ordered to pay $250,000 to the investors, plus $132,000 in attorney fees and court costs. The jury verdict damaged Brannon's 2014 primary campaign for the U.S. Senate. The civil judgment against Brannon was upheld by the North Carolina Court of Appeals in 2016 and by the North Carolina Supreme Court in 2019.

Political activism 
A staunch critic of President Barack Obama, Brannon was an early leader in the Tea Party movement in North Carolina. Brannon is strongly anti-abortion. He opposes the Affordable Care Act, asserting that the law "attacks the fabric" of constitutional rights, and favors a largely unregulated health care market. He supports a return to the gold standard and a phase-out of Social Security. In 2012, Brannon urged a vote for a third-party president candidate over Republican nominee Mitt Romney, asserting that "Casting a vote for either Obama or Romney will advance tyranny since both candidates are committed statists who despise the Constitution." Brannon's comments garnered scrutiny in his 2014 Republican primary campaign. During his 2016 primary campaign, Brannon said he would work to abolish the Internal Revenue Service (IRS), asserting that the agency was unconstitutional; during his campaign, Brannon acknowledged that he owed $175,000 in tax debt to the agency.

2014 U.S. Senate campaign 

In 2013, Brannon announced that he would seek the Republican nomination for U.S. Senate to challenge incumbent Kay Hagan. He won the endorsements of FreedomWorks, U.S. Senators Mike Lee and Rand Paul, and RedState's Erick Erickson.

Brannon lost the primary to Thom Tillis, the speaker of the state House. Tillis received about 46% of the vote, Brannon about 27%, and Baptist pastor Mark Harris about 17.5%.

2016 U.S. Senate campaign 
In December 2015, Brannon announced he would again run for the U.S. Senate in the 2016 election, challenging incumbent U.S. Senator Richard Burr in the Republican primary. He lost to Burr in the 2016 Republican primary. Burr received about 61% of the vote, while Brannon received about 25%.

Brannon later launched a weekly conservative talk radio show.

Personal life 
Brannon and his wife, Jody, have 7 children, three of whom are adopted. As a young adult, Brannon became an evangelical Christian.

References 

1960 births
Living people
20th-century American physicians
20th-century Christians
21st-century American physicians
21st-century Christians
Activists from California
Activists from North Carolina
American Christians
American gun rights activists
American libertarians
American political candidates
American radio hosts
Homeschooling advocates
Monetary reformers
Non-interventionism
North Carolina Republicans
People from Los Angeles
Physicians from North Carolina
Tea Party movement activists
University of Southern California alumni